The 5th constituency of Pyrénées-Atlantiques (French: Cinquième circonscription des Pyrénées-Atlantiques) is a French legislative constituency in Pyrénées-Atlantiques departments. Like the other 576 French constituencies, it elects one member of the National Assembly using the two-round system, with a run-off if no candidate receives over 50% of the vote in the first round. In the 2017 legislative election, Florence Lasserre-David of the Democratic Movement (MoDem) won a majority of the vote.

Deputies

Election results

2022

 
 
 
 
 
 
 
 
 
|-
| colspan="8" bgcolor="#E9E9E9"|
|-

2017

|- style="background-color:#E9E9E9;text-align:center;"
! colspan="2" rowspan="2" style="text-align:left;" | Candidate
! rowspan="2" colspan="2" style="text-align:left;" | Party
! colspan="2" | 1st round
! colspan="2" | 2nd round
|- style="background-color:#E9E9E9;text-align:center;"
! width="75" | Votes
! width="30" | %
! width="75" | Votes
! width="30" | %
|-
| style="background-color:" |
| style="text-align:left;" | Florence Lasserre-David
| style="text-align:left;" | Democratic Movement
| MoDem
| 
| 37.11
| 
| 57.03
|-
| style="background-color:" |
| style="text-align:left;" | Colette Capdevielle
| style="text-align:left;" | Socialist Party
| PS
| 
| 13.24
| 
| 42.97
|-
| style="background-color:" |
| style="text-align:left;" | Caroline Oustalet
| style="text-align:left;" | The Republicans
| LR
| 
| 11.33
| colspan="2" style="text-align:left;" |
|-
| style="background-color:" |
| style="text-align:left;" | Jérémy Farge
| style="text-align:left;" | La France Insoumise
| FI
| 
| 10.46
| colspan="2" style="text-align:left;" |
|-
| style="background-color:" |
| style="text-align:left;" | Jean-Michel Iratchet
| style="text-align:left;" | National Front
| FN
| 
| 7.15
| colspan="2" style="text-align:left;" |
|-
| style="background-color:" |
| style="text-align:left;" | Laurence Hardouin
| style="text-align:left;" | Regionalist
| REG
| 
| 5.66
| colspan="2" style="text-align:left;" |
|-
| style="background-color:" |
| style="text-align:left;" | Thibault Pathias
| style="text-align:left;" | Ecologist
| ECO
| 
| 4.22
| colspan="2" style="text-align:left;" |
|-
| style="background-color:" |
| style="text-align:left;" | Yves Ugalde
| style="text-align:left;" | Union of Democrats and Independents
| UDI
| 
| 3.49
| colspan="2" style="text-align:left;" |
|-
| style="background-color:" |
| style="text-align:left;" | Marie José Rivas
| style="text-align:left;" | Communist Party
| PCF
| 
| 2.39
| colspan="2" style="text-align:left;" |
|-
| style="background-color:" |
| style="text-align:left;" | Jean-Claude Labadie
| style="text-align:left;" | Independent
| DIV
| 
| 1.22
| colspan="2" style="text-align:left;" |
|-
| style="background-color:" |
| style="text-align:left;" | Pascal Lesellier
| style="text-align:left;" | Debout la France
| DLF
| 
| 1.05
| colspan="2" style="text-align:left;" |
|-
| style="background-color:" |
| style="text-align:left;" | Laurent Marlin
| style="text-align:left;" | Regionalist
| REG
| 
| 0.84
| colspan="2" style="text-align:left;" |
|-
| style="background-color:" |
| style="text-align:left;" | Rémy Iroz
| style="text-align:left;" | Miscellaneous Right
| DVD
| 
| 0.82
| colspan="2" style="text-align:left;" |
|-
| style="background-color:" |
| style="text-align:left;" | Romain Doïmo
| style="text-align:left;" | Independent
| DIV
| 
| 0.53
| colspan="2" style="text-align:left;" |
|-
| style="background-color:" |
| style="text-align:left;" | Philippe Bardanouve
| style="text-align:left;" | Far Left
| EXG
| 
| 0.48
| colspan="2" style="text-align:left;" |
|-
| colspan="8" style="background-color:#E9E9E9;"|
|- style="font-weight:bold"
| colspan="4" style="text-align:left;" | Total
| 
| 100%
| 
| 100%
|-
| colspan="8" style="background-color:#E9E9E9;"|
|-
| colspan="4" style="text-align:left;" | Registered voters
| 
| style="background-color:#E9E9E9;"|
| 
| style="background-color:#E9E9E9;"|
|-
| colspan="4" style="text-align:left;" | Blank/Void ballots
| 
| 1.92%
| 
| 10.83%
|-
| colspan="4" style="text-align:left;" | Turnout
| 
| 52.92%
| 
| 44.57%
|-
| colspan="4" style="text-align:left;" | Abstentions
| 
| 47.08%
| 
| 55.43%
|-
| colspan="8" style="background-color:#E9E9E9;"|
|- style="font-weight:bold"
| colspan="6" style="text-align:left;" | Result
| colspan="2" style="background-color:" | MoDEM GAIN FROM PS
|}

2012

|- style="background-color:#E9E9E9;text-align:center;"
! colspan="2" rowspan="2" style="text-align:left;" | Candidate
! rowspan="2" colspan="2" style="text-align:left;" | Party
! colspan="2" | 1st round
! colspan="2" | 2nd round
|- style="background-color:#E9E9E9;text-align:center;"
! width="75" | Votes
! width="30" | %
! width="75" | Votes
! width="30" | %
|-
| style="background-color:" |
| style="text-align:left;" | Colette Capdevielle
| style="text-align:left;" | Socialist Party
| PS
| 
| 37.70
| 
| 56.47
|-
| style="background-color:" |
| style="text-align:left;" | Jean Grenet
| style="text-align:left;" | Radical Party
| PR
| 
| 30.36
| 
| 43.53
|-
| style="background-color:" |
| style="text-align:left;" | Chantal Renou
| style="text-align:left;" | National Front
| FN
| 
| 7.14
| colspan="2" style="text-align:left;" |
|-
| style="background-color:" |
| style="text-align:left;" | Bernadette Lavigne
| style="text-align:left;" | Left Front
| FG
| 
| 5.62
| colspan="2" style="text-align:left;" |
|-
| style="background-color:" |
| style="text-align:left;" | Laurence Hardouin
| style="text-align:left;" | Regionalist
| REG
| 
| 5.28
| colspan="2" style="text-align:left;" |
|-
| style="background-color:" |
| style="text-align:left;" | Jean-Baptiste Mortalena
| style="text-align:left;" | Other
| AUT
| 
| 4.15
| colspan="2" style="text-align:left;" |
|-
| style="background-color:" |
| style="text-align:left;" | Marie-Ange Thebaud
| style="text-align:left;" | Europe Ecology – The Greens
| EELV
| 
| 3.62
| colspan="2" style="text-align:left;" |
|-
| style="background-color:" |
| style="text-align:left;" | Jacques Veunac
| style="text-align:left;" | Democratic Movement
| MoDem
| 
| 3.44
| colspan="2" style="text-align:left;" |
|-
| style="background-color:" |
| style="text-align:left;" | Pascal Lesellier
| style="text-align:left;" | Miscellaneous Right
| DVD
| 
| 0.84
| colspan="2" style="text-align:left;" |
|-
| style="background-color:" |
| style="text-align:left;" | Serge Nogues
| style="text-align:left;" | Far Left
| EXG
| 
| 0.76
| colspan="2" style="text-align:left;" |
|-
| style="background-color:" |
| style="text-align:left;" | Alexa Hilaire
| style="text-align:left;" | Ecologist
| ECO
| 
| 0.75
| colspan="2" style="text-align:left;" |
|-
| style="background-color:" |
| style="text-align:left;" | Danièle Hubert
| style="text-align:left;" | Far Left
| EXG
| 
| 0.35
| colspan="2" style="text-align:left;" |
|-
| style="background-color:" |
| style="text-align:left;" | Stéphane Bernard
| style="text-align:left;" | Other
| AUT
| 
| 0.00
| colspan="2" style="text-align:left;" |
|-
| colspan="8" style="background-color:#E9E9E9;"|
|- style="font-weight:bold"
| colspan="4" style="text-align:left;" | Total
| 
| 100%
| 
| 100%
|-
| colspan="8" style="background-color:#E9E9E9;"|
|-
| colspan="4" style="text-align:left;" | Registered voters
| 
| style="background-color:#E9E9E9;"|
| 
| style="background-color:#E9E9E9;"|
|-
| colspan="4" style="text-align:left;" | Blank/Void ballots
| 
| 1.33%
| 
| 3.88%
|-
| colspan="4" style="text-align:left;" | Turnout
| 
| 59.00%
| 
| 58.34%
|-
| colspan="4" style="text-align:left;" | Abstentions
| 
| 41.00%
| 
| 41.66%
|-
| colspan="8" style="background-color:#E9E9E9;"|
|- style="font-weight:bold"
| colspan="6" style="text-align:left;" | Result
| colspan="2" style="background-color:" | PS GAIN FROM UMP
|}

2007

|- style="background-color:#E9E9E9;text-align:center;"
! colspan="2" rowspan="2" style="text-align:left;" | Candidate
! rowspan="2" colspan="2" style="text-align:left;" | Party
! colspan="2" | 1st round
! colspan="2" | 2nd round
|- style="background-color:#E9E9E9;text-align:center;"
! width="75" | Votes
! width="30" | %
! width="75" | Votes
! width="30" | %
|-
| style="background-color:" |
| style="text-align:left;" | Jean Grenet
| style="text-align:left;" | Union for a Popular Movement
| UMP
| 
| 43.21
| 
| 52.93
|-
| style="background-color:" |
| style="text-align:left;" | Jean Espilondo
| style="text-align:left;" | Socialist Party
| PS
| 
| 27.65
| 
| 47.07
|-
| style="background-color:" |
| style="text-align:left;" | Marie-Hélène Chabaud-Nadin
| style="text-align:left;" | UDF-Democratic Movement
| UDF-MoDem
| 
| 9.85
| colspan="2" style="text-align:left;" |
|-
| style="background-color:" |
| style="text-align:left;" | Miguel Torre
| style="text-align:left;" | Regionalist
| REG
| 
| 4.50
| colspan="2" style="text-align:left;" |
|-
| style="background-color:" |
| style="text-align:left;" | Martine Bisauta
| style="text-align:left;" | The Greens
| LV
| 
| 3.57
| colspan="2" style="text-align:left;" |
|-
| style="background-color:" |
| style="text-align:left;" | Marie-José Espiaube
| style="text-align:left;" | Communist Party
| PCF
| 
| 3.55
| colspan="2" style="text-align:left;" |
|-
| style="background-color:" |
| style="text-align:left;" | Martine Mailfert
| style="text-align:left;" | Far Left
| EXG
| 
| 2.36
| colspan="2" style="text-align:left;" |
|-
| style="background-color:" |
| style="text-align:left;" | Chantal Renou
| style="text-align:left;" | National Front
| FN
| 
| 2.33
| colspan="2" style="text-align:left;" |
|-
| style="background-color:" |
| style="text-align:left;" | Guy Eneco
| style="text-align:left;" | Hunting, Fishing, Nature and Traditions
| CPNT
| 
| 1.44
| colspan="2" style="text-align:left;" |
|-
| style="background-color:" |
| style="text-align:left;" | Gildas Blandin
| style="text-align:left;" | Independent
| DIV
| 
| 0.70
| colspan="2" style="text-align:left;" |
|-
| style="background-color:" |
| style="text-align:left;" | Danièle Hubert
| style="text-align:left;" | Far Left
| EXG
| 
| 0.53
| colspan="2" style="text-align:left;" |
|-
| style="background-color:" |
| style="text-align:left;" | Pascal Lesellier
| style="text-align:left;" | Miscellaneous Right
| DVD
| 
| 0.30
| colspan="2" style="text-align:left;" |
|-
| colspan="8" style="background-color:#E9E9E9;"|
|- style="font-weight:bold"
| colspan="4" style="text-align:left;" | Total
| 
| 100%
| 
| 100%
|-
| colspan="8" style="background-color:#E9E9E9;"|
|-
| colspan="4" style="text-align:left;" | Registered voters
| 
| style="background-color:#E9E9E9;"|
| 
| style="background-color:#E9E9E9;"|
|-
| colspan="4" style="text-align:left;" | Blank/Void ballots
| 
| 1.38%
| 
| 4.01%
|-
| colspan="4" style="text-align:left;" | Turnout
| 
| 61.04%
| 
| 59.44%
|-
| colspan="4" style="text-align:left;" | Abstentions
| 
| 38.96%
| 
| 40.56%
|-
| colspan="8" style="background-color:#E9E9E9;"|
|- style="font-weight:bold"
| colspan="6" style="text-align:left;" | Result
| colspan="2" style="background-color:" | UMP HOLD
|}

2002

|- style="background-color:#E9E9E9;text-align:center;"
! colspan="2" rowspan="2" style="text-align:left;" | Candidate
! rowspan="2" colspan="2" style="text-align:left;" | Party
! colspan="2" | 1st round
! colspan="2" | 2nd round
|- style="background-color:#E9E9E9;text-align:center;"
! width="75" | Votes
! width="30" | %
! width="75" | Votes
! width="30" | %
|-
| style="background-color:" |
| style="text-align:left;" | Jean Grenet
| style="text-align:left;" | Union for a Presidential Majority
| UMP
| 
| 42.19
| 
| 55.08
|-
| style="background-color:" |
| style="text-align:left;" | Jean Espilondo
| style="text-align:left;" | Socialist Party
| PS
| 
| 29.44
| 
| 44.92
|-
| style="background-color:" |
| style="text-align:left;" | Josette Allizan
| style="text-align:left;" | National Front
| FN
| 
| 6.13
| colspan="2" style="text-align:left;" |
|-
| style="background-color:" |
| style="text-align:left;" | M. Jose Espiaube
| style="text-align:left;" | Communist Party
| PCF
| 
| 4,37
| colspan="2" style="text-align:left;" |
|-
| style="background-color:" |
| style="text-align:left;" | Martine Bisauta
| style="text-align:left;" | The Greens
| LV
| 
| 4.32
| colspan="2" style="text-align:left;" |
|-
| style="background-color:" |
| style="text-align:left;" | J. Marc Abadie
| style="text-align:left;" | Regionalist
| REG
| 
| 3.64
| colspan="2" style="text-align:left;" |
|-
| style="background-color:" |
| style="text-align:left;" | Serge Harismendy
| style="text-align:left;" | Miscellaneous Right
| DVD
| 
| 2.66
| colspan="2" style="text-align:left;" |
|-
| style="background-color:" |
| style="text-align:left;" | Guy Eneco
| style="text-align:left;" | Hunting, Fishing, Nature and Traditions
| CPNT
| 
| 2.59
| colspan="2" style="text-align:left;" |
|-
| style="background-color:" |
| style="text-align:left;" | Martine Mailfert
| style="text-align:left;" | Revolutionary Communist League
| LCR
| 
| 1.50
| colspan="2" style="text-align:left;" |
|-
| style="background-color:" |
| style="text-align:left;" | Claire Nobila
| style="text-align:left;" | Regionalist
| REG
| 
| 1.14
| colspan="2" style="text-align:left;" |
|-
| style="background-color:" |
| style="text-align:left;" | Daniele Hubert
| style="text-align:left;" | Workers’ Struggle
| LO
| 
| 0.69
| colspan="2" style="text-align:left;" |
|-
| style="background-color:" |
| style="text-align:left;" | Christiane De Pachtere
| style="text-align:left;" | National Republican Movement
| MNR
| 
| 0.45
| colspan="2" style="text-align:left;" |
|-
| style="background-color:" |
| style="text-align:left;" | Francis Ducasse
| style="text-align:left;" | Independent
| DIV
| 
| 0.41
| colspan="2" style="text-align:left;" |
|-
| style="background-color:" |
| style="text-align:left;" | Eduardo Eraso
| style="text-align:left;" | Far Left
| EXG
| 
| 0.32
| colspan="2" style="text-align:left;" |
|-
| style="background-color:" |
| style="text-align:left;" | J. Christophe Roman
| style="text-align:left;" | Independent
| DIV
| 
| 0.15
| colspan="2" style="text-align:left;" |
|-
| style="background-color:" |
| style="text-align:left;" | Xavier Larralde
| style="text-align:left;" | Regionalist
| REG
| 
| 0.00
| colspan="2" style="text-align:left;" |
|-
| colspan="8" style="background-color:#E9E9E9;"|
|- style="font-weight:bold"
| colspan="4" style="text-align:left;" | Total
| 
| 100%
| 
| 100%
|-
| colspan="8" style="background-color:#E9E9E9;"|
|-
| colspan="4" style="text-align:left;" | Registered voters
| 
| style="background-color:#E9E9E9;"|
| 
| style="background-color:#E9E9E9;"|
|-
| colspan="4" style="text-align:left;" | Blank/Void ballots
| 
| 2.13%
| 
| 4.38%
|-
| colspan="4" style="text-align:left;" | Turnout
| 
| 64.95%
| 
| 61.86%
|-
| colspan="4" style="text-align:left;" | Abstentions
| 
| 35.05%
| 
| 38.14%
|-
| colspan="8" style="background-color:#E9E9E9;"|
|- style="font-weight:bold"
| colspan="6" style="text-align:left;" | Result
| colspan="2" style="background-color:" | UMP GAIN FROM PS
|}

Sources
 French Interior Ministry results website: 
 

5